Osmeivy Ortega Pacheco (born 1980) is a Cuban visual artist based in Havana, Cuba.  He works primarily in large-scale, monochromatic lithographs featuring the human body and animals.

Biography 
Pacheco was born in 1980 in Havana. He specializes in lithographs of animals and nature. He originally spent four years studying to become a lawyer, but changed his focus to art. He apprenticed at the Manero Workshop in Cuba. He learned about lithography at the Instituto Superior de Arte, also known as the University of Arts. He spent his time at the university working on ways to advance the development of Cuba's culture. He decided to not continue down this path, seeing that this meant his work would have to be based on the politics of Cuba, and he did not want to be in the middle of the political issues in the country. He graduated from the Escuela Nacional de Bellas Artes "San Alejandro" in 2003, after which the school hired him as a professor. Pacheco currently teaches printmaking at the Instituto Superior de Arte.  Because paper can be a difficult material to acquire in Cuba, he is known to print his works of art on cleaning rags and mop fabric that is used to clean floors. Osmeivy collaborated and teamed up with the aid and relief of Hurricane Irma. In 2017, Pacheco was at Otahuhu College in New Zealand during a five-week artist-in-residence fellowship where he taught woodcarving to Maori students. Throughout this time, he was visited by the art department of King's College and worked alongside teachers and students.

Education 
 
Osmeivy Ortega Pacheco first studied at the Manero Workshop. Later on he graduated from the Escuela Nacional de Bellas Artes "San Alejandro" in Havana in 2003.

Artworks 
His art works are mainly large-scale pieces, and can reach eight feet tall in height. The titles he selects are personal, and reference a special part of his life. Aside from lithography, Pacheco creates woodcuts and linocuts. His main subject matter is animals, animal studies, and animals that are non-native to Cuba. He often uses non-native animals such as zebras and giraffes to emphasize Cuba's African roots. In addition to animals as subjects, he also features the human body and focuses on the muscular system. Pacheco frequently creates sets of prints, mostly in sets of five. He often employs graphite and stencils in his work to achieve different textures His works are predominantly monochromatic in nature with black, greys, and browns. 
Muscelos del Cuerpo (The muscles of the body), 2011, Woodblock print with graphite and stencil, 22''x29'' 
 Chihuahua, 2012, Wood Engraving, 27''x30'' 
 Paisaje (Landscape), 2011, Woodblock Print, 29''x44'' 
 Giraffe with Tire, 2012, Wood Engraving, 29''x27''
 Paisaje de Memoria, Color Lithograph, 2015, Collaborating printer: Maria Erikson
 Sonar Caribe, Color Lithograph with graphite stencil, 2015, Collaborating printer: Justin Andrews
 La Libertad se Defiende y se Muere por Ella, 2015, Three-color lithograph, Paper Type: Soft white Somerset satin, 18''x24'', Collaborating Printer: Bill Lagattuta, Edition of 15
 Sin Titulo (Untitled), 2016
Mural for Auckland Airport, Otahuhu College Art Students and Osmeivy Ortega Pacheco created the mural for the international airport of Auckland, 2017-2018
Untitled, 2012, Woodcut print on archival paper, 39 '' x 27 ½''

Exhibitions 
He has exhibited throughout Cuba, including at the Havana Biennial. Ortega completed a residency at the Tamarind Institute in 2015 and held an exhibition. His artwork has been presented and displayed at the following institutions: Cleveland Institute of Art, Museum of Contemporary Art Cleveland,  Art Museum of the Americas, New Mexico's Tamarind Institute, and the London Print Studio.

Honors and awards 
Osmeivy Ortega Pacheco received both the Honorable Mention award from the Tamarind Institute of the University of New México in 2004, and the Special Mention award from the 10th La Joven Estampa Prize in 2009.

Bibliography 

 Ashraf, Arooj. "CIA brings 5 Cuban artists to Cleveland." La Prensa, October 21, 2011, Vol.50.
 Encuentro Nacional de Grabado 2004, Encuentro Nacional de Grabado, University of Virginia, 2004.
Landis, Stefan. Lithography: main techniques. London : ISTE; Hoboken, N.J.,2011.
McQueeney-Jones-Mascolo, Frances. "Sales Robust At AD 20/21." Antinques and the Arts Weekly, April 16, 2013.
Ortega, Osmeivy (@osmeivyortega). 2021. Instagram.

References

External links 
 https://www.youtube.com/watch?v=GKdXHw8YoSg
 

Living people
1980 births
Cuban artists
Artists from Havana
Cuban lithographers